

Events 
20 February – John of Austria, through the agency of Girolamo Dalla Casa in Venice, purchases a large number of wind instruments and printed editions of music for his court, paying the considerable sum of 154 scudi, 3 lire, and 20 soldi in gold.
William Byrd becomes a Gentleman of the Chapel Royal.

Publications 
Lodovico Agostini
Enigmi musicali... il primo libro a sei... (Venice: Antonio Gardano and sons)
Second book of madrigals for four voices (Venice: Antonio Gardano and sons)
First book of canons and echo for six voices (Venice: Antonio Gardano and sons)
Ippolito Baccusi
Second book of madrigals for five voices (Venice: Girolamo Scotto)
Second book of madrigals for six voices (Venice: Girolamo Scotto)
Joachim a Burck
A Birthday song for the firstborn son of William IV, Landgrave of Hesse-Kassel for five voices (Mühlhausen: Georg Hantzsch)
Andrea Gabrieli – First book of masses for six voices (Venice: Antonio Gardano and sons)
Marc'Antonio Ingegneri – Second book of madrigals for five voices (Venice: Antonio Gardano, figliuoli)
Paolo Isnardi – Lamentations for five voices (Venice: Antonio Gardano, figliuoli)
Jacobus de Kerle
 for four, five, and six voices (Paris: Le Roy & Ballard)
 for five and six voices (Munich: Adam Berg)
Orlande de Lassus
 for four and eight voices (Paris: Le Roy & Ballard)
 for five voices (Munich: Adam Berg)
Paulus Melissus –  for four voices (Heidelberg: Michael Schirat), a German translation of Clément Marot and Théodore de Bèze's French psalms
Philippe de Monte – First book of motets for five voices (Venice: Girolamo Scotto)
Giovanni Pierluigi da Palestrina – Motettorum Liber Secundus (Second Book of Motets) for five, six, and eight voices
Francesco Portinaro – Third book of motets for five, six, seven, and eight voices (Venice: sons of Antonio Gardano)
Johann Rasch published in Munich:
Cantiunculae Paschales (Little Easter Songs)
Cantiones Ecclesiast. de Nativ. Christi, 4 voc.
In Monte Olivarum
Salve Regina, 6 voc.
Giulio Zacchini – Motetta a 4 vocum

Births 
February 14 – Hans Christoph Haiden, German composer, organist and poet
March 16 (baptized) – Daniel Bacheler, English lutenist and composer
May 25 – Maurice, Landgrave of Hesse-Kassel (or Hesse-Cassel), German music patron and composer (died 1632)
September 15 (baptized) – Erasmus Widmann, German composer, teacher, instrumentalist, organist, and poet
October 19 (baptized) – Paolo Fonghetto, Italian composer
December 27 – Johannes Vodnianus Campanus, Czech composer, pedagogue and humanist (died 1622)
date unknown
Martin Peerson (born ca. 1571 – ca. 1573; died 1650 or 1651), English composer, organist and virginalist
Thomas Tomkins, Welsh composer (died 1656)
Alessandro Ghivizzani, Italian composer

Deaths 
January – Robert Parsons, composer (born c.1535)
February 23 – Pierre Certon, French composer (born c1510)
August 28? – Claude Goudimel, French composer, murdered in the St. Bartholomew's Day Massacre. (born c1514)
 date unknown
Melchior Kreisstein, German music printer
Francesco Londariti (Frankiskos Leontaritis), Cretan composer, active in Venice and Munich
Christopher Tye, English composer (between August 27, 1571 and March 15, 1573)

References 

 
Music
16th century in music
Music by year